Ann A. Kiessling is an American reproductive biologist and a researcher in human parthenogenic stem cell research at The Bedford Research Foundation. She was an associate professor in teaching hospitals of Harvard Medical School (Brigham and Women's Hospital, Faulkner Hospital, New England Deaconess, and Beth Israel Deaconess Medical Center) from 1985 until 2012.

Background
Kiessling was born in Baker City, Oregon, United States, as Ann Anderson. Her father, Col. William Charles Anderson, was a decorated squadron commander in the US Air Force during World War II. She graduated from Klamath Falls High School in 1960 and attended University of Virginia where she received the first of her two bachelor's degrees in Nursing. In 1966 she received her second bachelor's degree in Chemistry from Central Washington University where she also received her master's degree in organic chemistry in 1967. In 1971 she earned her Ph.D. from Oregon State University in biochemistry and biophysics. She did postdoctoral research at Fred Hutchinson Cancer Research Center, Memorial Sloan-Kettering Cancer Center, and University of California, San Diego. Kiessling is mother of three daughters and a son.

Career
Kiessling is noted for her discovery of reverse transcriptase activity in normal human cells. This report pioneered the importance of naturally occurring retrovirus sequences in human genes, now thought to be important to the genetic plasticity involved in human evolution and biology. Prior to this discovery, it had been assumed that reverse transcriptase was an enzyme found only in retroviruses (such as human immunodeficiency virus). To understand the normal biologic role of reverse transcriptase, Kiessling began to study eggs and early cleaving embryos. Her dual interests in virology and reproductive biology led to research in semen transmission of human immunodeficiency virus, and the creation of the first laboratory for human in vitro fertilization in Oregon in the early 1980s. Harvard Medical School recruited Kiessling in 1985, where she conducted research until 2011. Kiessling currently conducts research at the Bedford Stem Cell Research Foundation.

The need to conduct biomedical research in areas not funded by the federal government led to the incorporation of the Bedford Stem Cell Research Foundation. The foundation's controversial Special Program of Assisted Reproduction has helped more than 300 couples with human immunodeficiency virus infection have healthy babies. Because of this success, more than 75 fertility centers throughout the country have implemented similar programs, allowing couples to seek care close to home. The techniques developed for the Special Program of Assisted Reproduction have been extended to other diseases of the male genitourinary tract, such as prostatitis and bladder infections. Expertise in human egg biology led Kiessling to develop the country's first human egg donor program for stem cell research in 2000. It remains a research focus today. Ann Kiessling's team was the first to establish the importance to circadian rhythms to early egg development.

Among the publications by Kiessling is the first comprehensive look at the influence of accurate science terminology on laws titled, "What is an Embryo," published by the Connecticut Law Review  along with rejoinders by Harold Shapiro, Prof John A. Robertson, Prof. Lars Noah, and Father Kevin P. Quinn. The law review addresses the controversy of all of the entities that are currently called embryos with regards to embryonic stem cell research legislation around the world. In 2003, Kiessling wrote Human Embryonic Stem Cells: An Introduction to the Science and Therapeutic Potential, the first textbook on the controversial topic.

Kiessling is a member of the California (California Constitution Article XXXV) and Connecticut Stem Cell Research Advisory Boards, and a member of the Embryonic Stem Cell Research Oversight Committees for Harvard University, Joslin Diabetes Center and Children's Hospital. Kiessling has been cited in articles in The Boston Globe, The Wall Street Journal, Los Angeles Times, The New York Times, and NPR among others.

SARS2 (Coronavirus)
In March 2020, Dr. Kiessling expanded her laboratory operations at the Bedford Research Foundation to include SARS2 (COVID-19) testing. On April 17, 2020 Dr. Kiessling reported that one of her daughters, a front-line worker at a local hospital, had tested positive for Coronavirus. Dr. Kiessling's frustration over the continued lack of available testing led her to expand the Foundation's SARS2 testing efforts to offer public testing.

Awards
2007 – Kiessling's Special Program of Assisted Reproduction was presented with the Technology Prize Paper Award by The American Society for Reproductive Medicine.
2009 – Kiessling received the Jacob Heskel Gabbay Award for Biotechnology and Medicine.
2010 – Central Washington University Distinguished Alumni Award,
2011 – First ever University of Virginia, School of Nursing, Alumni Achievement Award.
2014 – Honorary Doctorate and Lifetime Achievement Award from Jodhpur School of Public Health, Mumbai, India, presented at the 2014 HIV Congress in Mumbai.
2014 – Oregon State University Commencement Address
2014 – Honorary Doctorate in Cell and Molecular Biology, Oregon State University

Publications
Kiessling has published more than 100 scientific papers and given more than 60 lectures to audiences around the world. Selected publications are listed below:

Media

Boston Globe

Wall Street Journal

Los Angeles Times

New York Times

NPR

References

External links
 Bedford Research Foundation
 Harvard Medical School, Laboratory of Reproductive Biology
 Special Program of Assisted Reproduction at the Bedford Research Foundation
 NOVA Interview, "An Alternative To Cloning", April 1, 2005
Ann Kiessling Oral History Interview

Developmental biologists
American embryologists
HIV/AIDS researchers
Stem cell researchers
Living people
1942 births
American women biologists
American women chemists
Harvard Medical School faculty
Oregon State University alumni
University of Virginia School of Nursing alumni
People from Baker City, Oregon
20th-century American biologists
21st-century American biologists
21st-century chemists
20th-century American chemists
20th-century American women scientists
21st-century American women scientists
American women academics